The black mabuya (Exila nigropalmata)  is a species of skink in the family Scincidae. It is the only species in the monotypic genus Exila. It is found in Brazil, Bolivia, and Peru.

References

Skinks
Reptiles described in 1918
Taxa named by Lars Gabriel Andersson